The Ladies German Open was a professional golf tournament on the Ladies European Tour schedule. It was held annually from 1984 to 2014 except for two interruptions, 1992 to 1994 and 2002 to 2007.

Winners

References

External links

Ladies European Tour

German Open
Golf tournaments in Germany